The following lists events that happened during 1990 in New Zealand.

New Zealand celebrated its sesquicentennial, 150 years since the signing of The Treaty of Waitangi.

In the general election in October, National was elected in a landside victory.

GDP was $40.2 billion, unemployment was at 7.4% (March) and the exchange rate was 1 NZ$ per US$1.6750. This year New Zealand produced 8,000 million kWh of electricity.

Population
 Estimated population as of 31 December: 3,410,400
 Increase since 31 December 1989: 40,600 (1.20%)
 Males per 100 females: 97.3

Incumbents

Regal and viceregal
Head of State – Elizabeth II
Governor-General – Paul Reeves followed by Catherine Tizard

Government
The 42nd New Zealand Parliament continued, until the general election, held 27 October. The governing Labour Party was defeated. and The National Party, led by Jim Bolger, formed the new government.

Speaker of the House – Kerry Burke then Robin Gray
Prime Minister – Geoffrey Palmer then Mike Moore then Jim Bolger
Deputy Prime Minister – Helen Clark then Don McKinnon
Minister of Finance – David Caygill then Ruth Richardson
Minister of Foreign Affairs – Russell Marshall then Mike Moore then Don McKinnon
 Chief Justice — Sir Thomas Eichelbaum

Parliamentary opposition
 Leader of the Opposition – Jim Bolger (National), until 2 November, then Mike Moore (Labour) .
NewLabour Party – Jim Anderton (after 2 November General election)

Main centre leaders
Mayor of Auckland – Catherine Tizard then Les Mills
Mayor of Hamilton – Margaret Evans
Mayor of Wellington – Jim Belich
Mayor of Christchurch – Vicki Buck
Mayor of Dunedin – Richard Walls

Events

Unknown
 Telecom sold for $ 4.25 billion.
 New Zealand Bill of Rights Act passed
 The Tongariro National Park was inscribed on the UNESCO World Heritage list for its natural values.
Creation of Te Wahipounamu World Heritage site
 New Zealand ratifies the Second Optional Protocol to the International Covenant on Civil and Political Rights.
 New Zealand and the Netherlands signed a reciprocal Social Security Agreement in October 1990, which came into effect in 1992.
 Banning of wood chip exports.
 Green Party of Aotearoa New Zealand is formed.
 Establishment of the Forest Heritage Fund (later renamed "Nature Heritage Fund").
 Ministry for the Environment Green Ribbon Award established
 Penny Jamieson, Anglican Bishop of Dunedin, was ordained the first women Diocesan bishop in the world.

January
 24 January: Commonwealth Games are officially opened by Prince Edward in Auckland.

February
 1–16 February: Her Majesty Elizabeth II of New Zealand visits.
 3 February: Commonwealth Games are officially closed by Elizabeth II in Auckland, with New Zealand winning 58 medals,
6 February: New Zealand celebrates its sesquicentennial.

March
1 March – Royal New Zealand Navy discontinues the daily rum ration.

April
 30 April: One- and two-cent coins are withdrawn from legal tender.

May
 13 May: 6.2 Magnitude earthquake in Hawke's Bay

June

July
 1 July: Tariffs were eliminated between Australia and New Zealand under the Closer Economic Relations agreement. This was five years ahead of schedule

August

September
 4 September: Geoffrey Palmer: resigns as Prime Minister and is replaced by Mike Moore.

October
1 October: The Health Research Council of New Zealand is formed.
27 October – New Zealand general election returns National with record number of seats – 67; Labour 29, NewLabour 1
27 October: Referendum to increase Parliamentary term from three to four years defeated: 30.7% For, 69.3% Against.

November
 2 November:Jim Bolger becomes Prime Minister.
 2 November: Don McKinnon becomes Deputy Prime Minister
 2 November: Ruth Richardson became the first woman Minister of Finance.
 13 November: David Gray, an Aramoana resident, began a 22-hour shooting spree that left 13 people and Gray dead.

December
 Government announces $1.275 Billion worth of social welfare cuts.
 12 December: Dame Catherine Tizard becomes first woman Governor-General of New Zealand.

Arts and literature
David Eggleton wins the Robert Burns Fellowship.

See 1990 in art, 1990 in literature, :Category:1990 books

Music

New Zealand Music Awards
Winners are shown first with nominees underneath.
Album of the Year: The Chills – Submarine Bells
Brian Smith – Moonlight Sax
Straitjacket Fits – Melt
Single of the Year: The Chills – "Heavenly Pop Hit"
Margaret Urlich – Number One
Ngaire – To Sir With Love
Top Male Vocalist: Barry Saunders
John Grenell
Barry Saunders
Top Female Vocalist: Margaret Urlich
Patsy Riggir
Aishah
Top Group: The Chills
Straitjacket Fits
Fan Club
Most Promising Male Vocalist: Guy Wishart
Alan Galloway
John Kempt
Most Promising Female Vocalist: Merenia
Ngaire
Caroline Easther
Most Promising Group: Strawpeople
Merenia & Where's Billy
D-Faction
International Achievement: Fan Club
The Chills
Margaret Urlich
Best Video: Niki Caro – Bad Note for a Heart (Straitjacket Fits)
Paul Middleditch – One Good Reason (Strawpeople)
Lance Kelliher – Don't Let Me Fall Alone (The Fan Club)
Best Producer: Ian Morris – Heartbroke
Carl Doy – Moonlight Sax (Brian Smith)
Murray Grindlay – Welcome To Our World
Best Engineer: Strawpeople – Hemisphere
Ian Morris – Heartbroke (Rikki Morris)
Murray Grindlay – Welcome To Our World
Best Jazz Album: No Award
Best Classical Album: Dame Kiri Te Kanawa / Nszo — Kiri's Homecoming
Dame Malvina Major – Malvina Major
Kiri Te Kanawa/NZSO – Kiri at Aotea
Best Country Album: The Warratahs – Wild Card
John Grenell – Welcome To Our World
Bartlett/ Duggan/ Vaughn – Together Again
Best Folk Album: Rua — Commonwealth Suite
Martha Louise – Changing Tides
Iain Mitchell/Paul Yielder – Every Man And His Dog
Best Gospel Album: Cecily Phio — Light in the Darkness
Sound Ministry – Lead Me to the Rock
Scripture in Song – We Will Triumph
Best Polynesian Album: Herbs – Homegrown
National Maori Choir – Stand Tall
Te Mokai – Totara Tree
Best Songwriter: Martin Phillips — Heavenly Pop Hit (The Chills)
Shayne Carter – Bad Note for a Heart (Straitjacket fits)
Barry Saunders – Wild Card
Best Cover: John Collie – Melt (Straitjacket Fits)
Steve Garden/ Giles Molloy/ Kim Wesney – State of the Harp
Marc Mateo/ John Pitcairn – Hole
Outstanding Contribution to the Music Industry: Murdoch Riley

Performing arts

 Benny Award presented by the Variety Artists Club of New Zealand to Billy T. James MBE.

Radio and television
1 January: Avalon becomes a separate limited liability company.
5 February: The Auckland Television Centre is opened by Elizabeth II.
May: TV3 goes into receivership but continues broadcasting.
May: Sky Television launches with three channels.
May: CTV takes over TVNZ's Christchurch assets.  

See: 1990 in New Zealand television, 1990 in television, List of TVNZ television programming, :Category:Television in New Zealand, TV3 (New Zealand), :Category:New Zealand television shows, Public broadcasting in New Zealand

Film
An Angel at My Table
Flying Fox in a Freedom Tree
Meet the Feebles
Ruby and Rata

See: :Category:1990 film awards, 1990 in film, List of New Zealand feature films, Cinema of New Zealand, :Category:1990 films

Literature
Once Were Warriors published.

Sport

Athletics
 Tom Birnie wins his first national title in the men's marathon, clocking 2:17:33 on 3 March in New Plymouth, while Jillian Costley claims her third in the women's championship (2:36:43).

Commonwealth Games

Cricket
State Championship, won by Auckland.

Hockey

Netball

Horse racing

Harness racing
 New Zealand Trotting Cup: Neroship
 Auckland Trotting Cup: The Bru Czar

Thoroughbred racing
Auckland Cup: Miss Stanima

Rugby union
 Ranfurly Shield
Retained by Auckland.
Auckland beat King Country 58-3 in Auckland.
Auckland beat Poverty Bay 42-3 in Gisborne.
Auckland beat Southland 78-7 in Auckland.
Auckland beat Otago 45-9 in Auckland
Auckland beat North Auckland 41-21 in Auckland
Auckland beat North Harbour 18-9 in Auckland
Auckland beat Canterbury 33-30 in Auckland
16 June: The All Blacks beat Scotland 31 – 16 at Carisbrook.
23 June: The All Blacks beat Scotland 21 – 18 at Eden Park.
 21 July: The All Blacks beat Australia 21 – 6	 at Lancaster Park.
4 August: The All Blacks beat Australia 21-18 at Eden Park.
18 August: The All Blacks lose to Australia 9 – 21 at Athletic Park.
 3 November:The All Blacks beat France 24-3 at 	Stade de la Beaujoire.
 10 November: The All Blacks beat France 30-12 at Parc des Princes.

Rugby league

Shooting
Ballinger Belt – Alistair "Sandy" Marshall (Kaituna/Blenheim)

Squash
Susan Devoy wins the World Championship beating Martine Le Moignan 9-4, 9–4, 9–4.

Soccer
 The Chatham Cup is won by Mount Wellington who beat Christchurch United 3–3 (4-2 on penalties) in the final.
New Zealand National Soccer League: Waitakere City
 The inaugural Winfield Provincial Championship was held between regional representative teams. The winner was Canterbury, who beat Auckland 2-1 (after extra time) in the final.

Tennis

Births

January
 3 January – Monikura Tikinau, rugby league player
 4 January
 Liaki Moli, rugby union player
 Augustine Pulu, rugby union player
 5 January – Larissa Harrison, netball player
 10 January – Dion Prewster, basketball player
 11 January – Vaughn Scott, taekwondo practitioner
 12 January – Neccrom Areaiiti, rugby league player
 13 January
 David Bishop, gymnast
 Teneale Hatton, flatwater canoeist
 14 January – Tom Scully, road and track cyclist
 15 January – Kane Morgan, rugby league player
 16 January
 Jason Hicks, association footballer
 Sam Prattley, rugby union player
 17 January – Cameron Leslie, Paralympic swimmer
 18 January – Taioalo Vaivai, rugby league player
 19 January – Kerry-Anne Tomlinson, cricketer
 22 January – Dean Whare, rugby league player
 24 January – James Fuller, cricketer
 25 January – Liam Coltman, rugby union player
 29 January – Kalifa Faifai Loa, rugby league player

February
 3 February – Martin Taupau, rugby league player
 7 February – Elias Shadrock, netball player
 10 February – Nathan Vella, rugby union player
 11 February – Joe Tomane, rugby union player
 12 February – Tamati Clarke, cricketer
 13 February – Dan Hooker, mixed martial artist
 19 February – Kosta Barbarouses, association footballer
 20 February
 Mark Abbott, rugby union player
 Samuel Brunton, rugby league player
 24 February – Morna Nielsen, cricketer
 27 February - Elijah Taylor, rugby league player

March
 1 March – Julianna Naoupu, netball player
 3 March – Nardia Roselli, netball player
 8 March – Gemma Dudley, track cyclist
 9 March
 Joel Everson, rugby union player
 Matt Robinson, rugby league player
 11 March – Aroha Savage, rugby union player
 13 March – Josh Bloxham, basketball player
 15 March – Rebecca Torr, snowboarder
 16 March – Moira de Villiers, judoka
 17 March - Billy Guyton, rugby union player
 18 March – Lou Guinares, weightlifter
 19 March – Fraser Colson, cricketer
 22 March – Angus Ta'avao, rugby union player
 24 March – Keisha Castle-Hughes, actor
 26 March – Uini Atonio, rugby union player
 27 March
 Kimbra Johnson, recording artist
 Leivaha Pulu, rugby league player
 31 March – Tommy Smith, association footballer

April
 1 April – Alecz Day, cricketer
 2 April – Drury Low, rugby league player
 7 April
 Bundee Aki, rugby union player
 George Bennett, road cyclist
 Ronald Raaymakers, rugby union player
 10 April
 Kelsey Bevan, rower
 Siuatonga Likiliki, rugby league player
 13 April – Shane Pumipi, rugby league player
 14 April – Sean Polwart, rugby union player
 16 April – Kane Barrett, rugby union player
 19 April – Benny Tipene, singer-songwriter
 24 April – Amaka Gessler, swimmer
 26 April
 Terri-Amber Carlson, association footballer
 Ashika Pratt, fashion model

May
 2 May – Gemma Flynn, field hockey player
 3 May
 Sam Beard, rugby union player
 Lama Tasi, rugby league player
 9 May – Daniel Bell, swimmer
 10 May – Oliver Leydon-Davis, badminton player
 11 May – Blair Tarrant, field hockey player
 14 May – William Lloyd, rugby union player
 16 May – Renee Leota, association footballer
 17 May
 Charlie Gubb, rugby league player
 Susannah Pyatt, sailor
 Jason Woodward, rugby union player
 18 May – Jossi Wells, freestyle skier
 23 May – Pippa Hayward, field hockey player
 28 May
 Cody Cole, weightlifter
 Gillies Kaka, rugby union player
 30 May – Nigel Ah Wong, rugby union player
 31 May – Tyler Bleyendaal, rugby union player

June
 1 June – Frances Mackay, cricketer
 4 June – Shay Neal, field hockey player
 5 June – Amber Bellringer, netball player
 6 June 
 Ben Funnell, rugby union player
 Paige Hareb, surfer
 7 June – Stephen Jenness, field hockey player
 8 June – Todd Barclay, politician
 15 June – John Gatfield, swimmer
 17 June – Paul Lasike, American football player
 21 June – Nafe Seluini, rugby league player
 22 June – Abigail Guthrie, tennis player
 24 June – Kalolo Tuiloma, rugby union player
 26 June – Jake Gleeson, association footballer
 29 June – Te Rina Keenan, discus thrower

July
 2 July 
 Elias Shadrock, netball player
 Bill Tupou, rugby league player
 5 July – Tom Marshall, rugby union player
 6 July – Willis Halaholo, rugby union player
 9 July – Earl Bamber, motor racing driver
 12 July – Simon Berghan, rugby union player
 13 July – Kieran Foran, rugby league player
 16 July – Bureta Faraimo, rugby league player
 18 July – Gerard Beale, rugby league player
 20 July
 Jess Hamill, Paralympic athlete
 Will Tupou, rugby union and rugby league player
 24 July – Danny Lee, golfer
 25 July – Ellen Halpenny, netball player
 30 July - Myron Simpson, road and track cyclist
 31 July – Orinoco Faamausili-Banse, swimmer

August
 4 August – Betsy Hassett, association footballer
 5 August – Anurag Verma, cricketer
 6 August
 Daniel Willcox, sailor
 Nick Wilson, field hockey player
 7 August – Julian Savea, rugby union player
 8 August – Kane Williamson, cricketer
 9 August
 Darryl Fitzgerald, sprint canoeist
 Michael O'Keeffe, association footballer
 11 August – Tom Franklin, rugby union player
 15 August – Tawera Kerr-Barlow, rugby union player
 16 August – Matt Duffie, rugby union and rugby league player
 17 August – Charlie Ngatai, rugby union player
 20 August
 Anna Green, association footballer
 Jordan Hunter, basketball player
 21 August – Rachel Maree Millns, beauty pageant contestant
 28 August – James Coughlan, field hockey player

September
 1 September
 Tom Blundell, cricketer
 Ben Seymour, rugby union player
 3 September – Paul Snow-Hansen, sailor
 6 September
 Andrew Cox, ice hockey player
 Pama Fou, rugby union player
 7 September
 Paki Afu, rugby league player
 Logan van Beek, cricketer
 9 September – Shaun Johnson, rugby league player
 11 September – Elijah Niko, rugby union player
 12 September – Anna Peterson, cricketer
 16 September – Emily Collins, road cyclist
 17 September
 Tim Myers, association footballer
 Jimmy Neesham, cricketer
 21 September – Sam Kasiano, rugby league player
 23 September – Lea Tahuhu, cricketer
 24 September
 Kayne Hammington, rugby union player
 Johnny McNicholl, rugby union player
 Namatahi Waa, rugby union player
 25 September – Genevieve Behrent, rower
 27 September – Finn Tearney, tennis player
 28 September – Doug Bracewell, cricketer

October
 1 October – Finn Lowery, water polo player
 7 October – Popsy, Thoroughbred racehorse
 12 October – Shannon Francois, netball player
 15 October – Harry Boam, cricketer
 18 October – Anthony Gelling, rugby league player
 23 October – Stan Walker, recording artist, actor, television personality
 24 October – Tipene Friday, cricketer and basketball player
 28 October
 Sarah Gray, rower
 Tim Johnston, cricketer
 29 October – Craig Millar, rugby union player

November
 2 November – Kane Radford, swimmer
 4 November – Zane Tetevano, rugby league player
 5 November – George Moala, rugby union player
 8 November – Sacha Jones, tennis player
 11 November
 Sir Vancelot, standardbred racehorse
 Merissa Smith, association footballer
 12 November – Simon Evans, motor racing driver
 17 November – Doriemus, Thoroughbred racehorse
 18 November – Jackie Thomas, singer
 19 November
 Hayden Parker, rugby union player
 Jeffery Toomaga-Allen, rugby union player
 21 November - Jackson Ormond, rugby union player
 22 November – Jason Saunders, sailor
 26 November – Aaron Gate, track cyclist
 28 November
 Declan O'Donnell, rugby union player
 Brendon Edmonds, rugby union player

December
 2 December – Glen Fisiiahi, rugby union and rugby league player
 3 December – Mark Ioane, rugby league player
 4 December – Blade Thomson, rugby union player
 5 December – Curtis Rapley, rower
 7 December – Simon Berghan, rugby union player
 11 December – Elizabeth Milne, association footballer
 13 December – Corey Anderson, cricketer
 15 December
 Nehe Milner-Skudder, rugby union player
 Ella Nicholas, slalom canoeist
 Skye Lourie, actress
 20 December – Robert Whittaker, mixed martial artist
 22 December – Jason Christie, cyclist
 26 December – Telusa Veainu, rugby union player
 27 December – Priyani Puketapu, beauty pageant contestant
 31 December – Marlon Williams, singer-songwriter

Exact date unknown
 Avianca Böhm, beauty pageant contestant
 Catherine Irving, beauty pageant contestant
 Jamie Love, softball player

Deaths

January
 1 January – Bill Pullar, athlete (born 1913)
 7 January – Esther James, fashion model (born 1900)
 20 January – Freda Cook, social and peace campaigner (born 1896)
 22 January – William Stodart, rower (born 1904)

February
 7 February – Tony Fomison, artist (born 1939)
 12 February – Hilcote Pitts-Brown, politician (born 1905)
 17 February – Rusty Robertson, rowing coach (born 1927)
 27 February – Torchy Atkinson, horticultural scientist, science administrator (born 1909)

March
 6 March
 Joan Faulkner-Blake, broadcaster (born 1921)
 Arthur Pearce, broadcaster (born 1903)
 8 March – Donald Cameron, cricketer (born 1908)
 11 March – Francis Ward, rugby union player (born 1900)
 31 March – Bill Murray, police officer, unionist (born 1896)

April
 8 April – Zamazaan, Thoroughbred racehorse (foaled 1965)
 11 April – Leonard Leary, lawyer, writer (born 1891)
 12 April – John Brown, cyclist (born 1916)
 14 April – Doris Lusk, artist, potter (born 1916)
 23 April – Alan Robilliard, rugby union player (born 1903)
 26 April – Arthur Knight, rugby union player (born 1906)
 28 April – Neil Watson, Mayor of Invercargill (born 1905)

May
 4 May – Jack Lewin, union leader, public servant (born 1915)
 7 May – Ashley Lawrence, conductor (born 1934)
 10 May – Hilda Buck, cricketer (born 1914)
 14 May – Ruth Mason, botanist (born 1913)
 27 May
 Clarrie Heard, swimmer (born 1906)
 June Sutor, crystallographer (born 1929)
 31 May – Hamilton Walker, engineer and inventor (born 1903)

June
 3 June – Phil Gard, rugby union player (born 1947)
 9 June – John Holland, athlete (born 1926)
 11 June – Joan Stevens, English literature academic (born 1908)
 14 June – Adrian Hayter, soldier, sailor, Antarctic leader, author (born 1914)
 15 June – Eruera Manuera, Ngāti Awa leader (born 1895)
 19 June – Isobel Andrews, writer (born 1905)
 20 June – Lois Suckling, optician, family planning reformer (born 1893)

July
 1 July – Lorrie Hunter, politician (born 1900)
 3 July – Vic Olsson, rower (born 1903)
 4 July – Ces Devine, harness racing driver (born 1915)
 9 July – Jack Sullivan, rugby union player, coach and administrator (born 1915)
 24 July – Marcel Stanley, philatelist (born 1918)

August
 6 August – Frank Waters, politician (born 1907)
 8 August – Bill Gallagher, inventor, businessman (born 1911)
 16 August – Pat O'Connor, professional wrestler (born 1924)

September
 4 September
 Sir Henry Cooper, cricketer, educator (born 1909)
 Leslie Groves, cricketer (born 1911)
 23 September – Bill Broughton, jockey (born 1913)
 28 September – Dan Davin, author (born 1913)

October
 2 October – Eric Giles, cricketer (born 1939)
 3 October – Esmond de Beer, literary editor, collector, philanthropist (born 1895)
 9 October – John Holland, Anglican bishop (born 1912)
 10 October – Nitama Paewai, rugby union player and administrator, doctor, politician (born 1920)
 12 October – John O'Brien, politician (born 1925)

November
 9 November – Harry Evans, exploration geologist (born 1912)
 13 November – Stewart Guthrie, police officer (born 1948)
 15 November – Oswald Denison, rower (born 1905)
 18 November – Murray Ashby, rower (born 1931)
 22 November
 James Barron, cricketer (born 1900)
 Noel Chambers, swimmer (born 1923)
 25 November – Ernest Duncan, mathematician (born 1916)
 27 November – Joan Wood, educationalist and music teacher (born 1909)

December
 14 December – Sam Cusack, community character (born 1919)
 17 December – Frank Hutchison, cricketer (born 1897)
 18 December – Greta Stevenson, mycologist (born 1911)
 24 December – Alex O'Shea, farming leader (born 1902)
 25 December
 Viola Bell, sports administrator, community leader (born 1897)
 Warwick Snedden, cricketer (born 1920)

Exact date unknown
 Bruce Campbell, lawyer, politician, jurist (born 1916)

See also
History of New Zealand
List of years in New Zealand
Military history of New Zealand
Timeline of New Zealand history
Timeline of New Zealand's links with Antarctica
Timeline of the New Zealand environment

References

External links

 
New Zealand
Years of the 20th century in New Zealand